Zamira Ismailovna Usmanova is an Uzbek archaeologist and the first woman to graduate from the National University of Uzbekistan's Department of Archaeology. One of few female archaeologists in Central Asia, her works and research allowed for the dating of the  city of Merv, Erk-Kala. She has published about 150 scientific publications on archaeology and the history of art of Central Asia.

Early life 
Usmanova was born in Samarkand. She lived with her family in Turkmenistan, but the family moved to Tashkent after the Ashgabat earthquake in 1948.

Education and career 
Usmanova graduated from Tashkent in 1950 before enrolling in Tashkent State University's Faculty of History and Archaeology under Mikhail Evgenievich Masson. During her studies, she was an active member of the Scientific Circle and together with Svetlana Lunina, commissioned by Masson, she examined several monuments in the Tashkent region whose results have been published. She also participated in the archaeological excavations organized by the South Turkmenistan Multi-Disciplinary Archaeological Expedition (YuTAKE) led by Masson.

Following the success of her postgraduate studies, she was hired as a teacher where she taught courses on history, archaeology, and Eastern studies. As a teacher, Usmanova trained international students from Africa and the Middle East to promote and enhance knowledge of the archaeology of Uzbekistan, Central Asia, and the Caucasus.

Usmanova engaged in research work regarding historical printing in Shakhrisabz houses and archaeological sites in the Kesh region. With YuTAKE, she investigated the archaeology of the ancient settlement of Merv, Erk-Kala, which became the subject of her thesis in 1969.

From 1981 to 1992, she was the chair of the Department of Archaeology of Central Asia at Tashkent State University. During her leadership at the Department of Archaeology, Usmanova and her team undertook excavations on the site of Erk-Kala, revealing the ancient urbanization of Merv and establishing its age. For this achievement, UNESCO recognized Usmanova alongside Uzbek archaeologist Galina Pugachenkova.

In the 1990s, Usmanova led several excavations to determine the age of Shakhrisabz, the birthplace of Amir Temur. In 1997, the Kesh region became a subject of study from the late Bronze Age and early Iron Age. As a result of the archaeological material discovered and its identification as the historical city of Kesh, the age of the city was determined and, in 2002, its 2700th anniversary was celebrated.

Usmanova worked in the Department of History at Tashkent State University from until her retirement in 1996. Although she is retired, she still participates in scientific conferences.

Selected publications 

 Z. I. Usmanova and S.B. Lunina. From archaeological observations on Kugait tepe near Tashkent. Transactions of SAGU.  Vol.  LXXXI.  Tashkent, 1956.
 Z. I. Usmanova and S.B. Lunina. Some archaeological observations on the towns of Chinaz and Zangi-Ata. Transactions of SAGU IV (Issue CXI).  Tashkent, 1957.
 Z. I. Usmanova.  About the time of the occurrence of the settlement on the site of the Erk-Kala settlement. Bulletin of the Academy of Sciences of the TSSR.  Series of societies. Ashgabat, 1960.
 Z. I. Usmanova. Ceramic kernels from Merv. Transactions of Tashkent State University.  Vol.  172. Archeology of Central Asia V. Tashkent, 1960.
 Z. I. Usmanova and S. B. Lunina. Ceramics from the settlement of Nogai-Kurgan near Tashkent. Transactions of Tashkent State University.  Vol.  172. Archeology of Central Asia V. Tashkent, 1960.
 Z. I. Usmanova. New finds of fragments of ancient tissues from Erk-kala in Old Merv. Izvestiya AN TSSR.  Series of societies. Ashgabat, 1961.
 Z. I. Usmanova and I. A. Akhrarov. Beads from Kuva. Transactions of Tashkent State University.  Vol.  200. Archeology of Central Asia.  VI. Tashkent, 1963.
 Z. I. Usmanova and G. A. Koshelenko. Corinthized capital from Merv. Izvestiya AN TSSR.  Series of societies. Ashgabat, 1963.
 Z. I Usmanova. Erk-kala (based on materials from UTAKE 1955-1969). Transactions of UTAKE.  T. XII.  Ashkhabad, 1963.
 Z. I. Usmanova. Excavations of a workshop of an artisan of Parthian time on the site of the city of Gyaurkala. Transactions of the UTAKE.  T. XII.  Ashgabat, 1963.
 Z. I. Usmanova and  G. A. Koshelenko. On the history of urban fortifications of the ancient Merv. Bulletin of the Academy of Sciences of the TSSR.  Series of societies.  sciences.  Ashgabat, 1964.
 Z. I. Usmanova. New data on the historical topography of the city of Shakhrisabz. Materials of the session devoted to the results of archaeological and ethnographic studies of 1964 in the USSR.  Abstracts of reports.  Baku, 1965.
 Z. I. Usmanova. Erk-Kala - the settlement of Old Merv from the time of antiquity and the early Middle Ages (to the history of the development of the ancient cities of Central Asia).  AKD.  Tashkent, 1969.
 Z. I. Usmanova. New data on the history of Shakhrisabz I Materials on the history and archeology of Uzbekistan. Scientific works of Tashkent State University.  Vol. 441. Tashkent, 1973.
 Z. I. Usmanova and G. Ya. Dresvyanskaya. New data for the study of monuments of the middle course of Kashkadarya. Scientific works of Tashkent State University.  Vol.  473. Materials on the history and archeology of Central Asia. Tashkent, 1974.
 Z. I. Usmanova and G. Ya. Dresvyanskaya. On the stratigraphy of the upper cultural layers of the medieval fortifications of the Kamashinsky district. Materials on history, historiography and archeology.  Scientific works of Tashkent State University.  Vol.  482. Tashkent, 1975.
 Z. I. Usmanova. The study of the walls and the Buddhist monument in Merv. Collection of scientific works of Tashkent State University.  Issue 517.  Tashkent, 1976.
 Z. I. Usmanova. The historical topography of Shakhrisabz in the light of new data. Scientific works of Tashkent State University, issue 533, Tashkent, 1977.
 Z. I. Usmanova and I. Akhrarov. New data on the history of Bukhara. History and archeology of Central Asia.  Ashkhabad, 1978.
 Z. I. Usmanova and A. S.  Sagdullaev. Toward the study of monuments of the Yakkabag region. Materials on history, historiography and archeology. Sat  scientific works of Tashkent State University.  Ne 583. Tashkent, 1981.
 Z. I. Usmanova. The work of the Department of Archeology of Tashkent State University on the archaeological study of the city of Ahsiket. Materials on the archeology of Central Asia. Sat  scientific works.  Ne 707. Tashkent, 1983.
 Z. I. Usmanova and G. A. Koshelenko and M. I. Filanovich. Margiana. Archeology of the USSR.  The oldest states of the Caucasus and Central Asia. Science, 1985.

References 

Uzbekistani women archaeologists
Soviet archaeologists
Central Asia